Kabiru Oluwamuyiwa Alausa (born 28 March 1983) is a Nigerian retired footballer who played as a forward. He is an assistant coach at Nigerian club Shooting Stars.

Career
Alausa began his career playing with Julius Berger and was the top scorer of the Nigerian Premier League in 2004, scoring 13 goals on the season. He then moved to Sunshine Stars, where he played through the 2007 season. Alausa spent time at Heartland, helping the club become runners-up in the 2009 CAF Champions League although he missed several matches while on trial in Europe. After a second stint at Sunshine Stars, he finished his playing career with Shooting Stars.

References

Living people
1983 births
Yoruba sportspeople
Nigerian footballers
Association football forwards
Bridge F.C. players
Sunshine Stars F.C. players
Heartland F.C. players
Shooting Stars S.C. players
Nigeria Professional Football League players